Saints & Sinners is an American prime time television soap opera. Starring Vanessa Bell Calloway, Clifton Powell, Keith Robinson, Christian Keyes, and Gloria Reuben.  The series premiered on the African-American-oriented television network Bounce TV on March 6, 2016, as the network's first original drama.

On February 2, 2022, it was announced that the sixth and final season would run from April 3 to May 22, 2022.

Premise
The series follows the daily lives of members of a Baptist church in a small town in Georgia. The destinies of Pastor Darryl Greene (David Banner) and the choir director (Keith Robinson) will be crossed with those of Lady Ella Johnson (Vanessa Bell Calloway).

Production
On May 7, 2015, Bounce TV announced that it had ordered a new original drama, Saints & Sinners, from independent production company Swirl Films to premiere in 2016. The series serves as the first original drama commissioned by the African-American-oriented digital television network, whose previous originals were sitcoms. Saints & Sinners has been compared to the Oprah Winfrey Network drama series Greenleaf, which is also set at an African-American run church and is being produced in Atlanta at the same time.

The eight-episode first season began filming in Atlanta, Georgia in January 2016. On January 12, 2016, Vanessa Bell Calloway, Gloria Reuben, Clifton Powell, Richard Lawson, Keith Robinson, Christian Keyes, Jasmine Burke, J. D. Williams, and Afemo Omilami were announced as main cast members of the series . The pilot was directed by filmmaker Jerry Lamothe. Principal photography ended February 25, 2016. To promote the series, Bounce TV allowed affiliates who carry the network on a digital subchannel to air an encore of the series premiere on their main channels.  On April 13, 2016 the show was renewed for a second season that premiered on March 5, 2017. Bounce announced on January 22, 2019 via their Twitter account that the show was renewed for a fourth season, set to premiere on July 7, 2019. On August 11, 2020, the series was renewed for a fifth season and a stand-alone film has been also announced. The series followed up with a made-for-TV movie titled Saints & Sinners: Judgment Day which aired February 14, 2021 on Bounce TV. On February 2, 2022, the series was renewed for a sixth and final season due to premiere on April 3, 2022.

Cast

Main

 Vanessa Bell Calloway as Lady Ella Johnson
 Gloria Reuben as the Mayor Pamela Clayborne (Seasons 1, 2)
 Christian Keyes as Levi Sterling (Season 1–3; Guest, Season 4–6)
 Jasmine Burke as Dr. Christie Johnson
 Clifton Powell as Rex Fisher
 Keith Robinson as Miles Calloway
 J. D. Williams as Jabari Morris
 David Banner as Pastor Darryl Greene
 Tray Chaney as Kendrick Murphy
 Demetria McKinney (Season 1–4) and Ashani Roberts (Season 5–6) as Tamara Austin/Tamara Austin Callaway
 Lisa Arrindell as Rebecca Jourdan
 Emilio Rivera as Officer Francisco Cooper
 Afemo Omilami as Detective Noah St. Charles
 Donna Biscoe as Lady Leona Byrd

Recurring

 Dawn Halfkenny as Angela Parks
 Jonny Hazen as Vice Det. Mario Rodriguez
 Kendrick Cross as Ben Truman
 Chris Gann as Travis Ford
 Sarafina King Rachel
 Maria Howell as Lt. Hawkins
 Tony Vaughn as Vernon
 Richard Lawson as Pastor Evan Johnson
 Summer Parker as Savannah Sterling
 Jeff Rose as Chief Herman Douglas
 Neil Carter as Maxwell Wallace
 Karlie Redd as Paige Morris
 Chelle Ramos as Detective Josephine Alvarez
 Jevon "Vawn" Sims as T.K.
 Mara Hall as Caledonia Kendall
 L. Warren Young as Zeke
 Dorothy Steel as Mother Harris
 Robin Givens as Wilhelmina Hayworth
 Keke Wyatt as Lady Azia Greene
 Kaye Singleton as Josie
Patrice Fisher as Stacia Cunningham (Season 2–5) & Anna (Season 6)
Anthony Dalton (Season 3) and Karon Riley (Season 4–5) as Malik Thompson
 Tami Roman (Season 4) and Lisa Wu (Season 5) as Felicia Thompson
 Gregalan Willams (Season 5) as Victor Thompson
  Michael Anthony (Season 6) as Ray Ray

Television movie 
Saints & Sinners announced they would air an all new original made-for-TV film titled Saints & Sinners: Judgement Day, which aired on Bounce TV, Valentine’s Day, 2021. The movie chronicles the events that ended in season 4, leading into season 5 which has been completed in production and soon to be aired in the spring of 2021.

Episodes

Series overview

<onlyinclude>

Season 1 (2016)

Season 2 (2017)

Season 3 (2018)

Season 4 (2019)

Special (2021)

Season 5 (2021)

Season 6 (2022)

Reception 
Saints & Sinners has received mixed to positive reviews from critics, but became a breakthrough series for Bounce TV, and their most-watched program ever since it launched. The first episode earned 1.3 million viewers, and in second week it drew 1.5 million viewers.

References

External links 
 
 

2010s American black television series
2010s American drama television series
English-language television shows
American television soap operas
American primetime television soap operas
2016 American television series debuts
Television shows set in Georgia (U.S. state)
Television shows filmed in Georgia (U.S. state)
2010s American LGBT-related drama television series
Bounce TV original programming
Baptist drama television series